Higman's theorem may refer to:
 Hall–Higman theorem in group theory, proved in 1956 by Philip Hall and Graham Higman
 Higman's embedding theorem in group theory, by Graham Higman

See also
 Higman's lemma

Mathematics disambiguation pages